The 1948 All-Ireland Junior Hurling Championship was the 27th staging of the All-Ireland Junior Championship since its establishment by the Gaelic Athletic Association in 1912.

Cork entered the championship as the defending champions, however, they were beaten by Limerick in the Munster final.

The All-Ireland final replay was played on 31 October 1948 at Páirc Tailteann in Navan, between Meath and London, in what was their first ever meeting in the final. Meath won the match by 2-07 to 2-05 to claim their second championship title overall and a first title in 21 years.

Results

All-Ireland Junior Hurling Championship

All-Ireland semi-finals

All-Ireland home final

All-Ireland finals

References

Junior
All-Ireland Junior Hurling Championship